This is a list of cathedrals in the state of Texas, United States:

See also
List of cathedrals in the United States

References

 Texas
Cathedrals in Texas
Texas
Cathedrals